Veggli is a village in the municipality of Rollag, in the county of Buskerud, Norway.
<ref>[https://snl.no/Veggli%2Ftettsted  Veggli – tettsted']  Store norske leksikon  </ref>

Veggli is located about 66 kilometers north of Kongsberg. It is located in the traditional district and valley of Numedal.  It is situated on the Numedalslågen River, near the mouth of Nørdsteåas estuary. Its population in 2005 was 292.

Veggli train station was on the Numedal Line. The line ran from Kongsberg to Rødberg in Nore og Uvdal. The line was officially opened in 1927. Passenger traffic on the track was closed in 1988. West from Veggli, the road goes over Vegglifjell where Veggli Lodge and Veggli Skisenter are located. Further the road leads to the villages of Austbygdi and Tessungdalen in Tinn.

Veggli Church (Veggli kirke'') in Kongsberg deanery.  It was constructed of wood and designed by  the architect  Christian Heinrich Grosch (1801–1865).  The church has 160 seats. The church  dates from 1859 and has protected status listed.

Notable residents
Ole Knudsen Nattestad and Ansten Nattestad - pioneer founders of the Jefferson Prairie Settlement in the state of Wisconsin.
Sigurd Pettersen - Famous ski jumper who represents the local sports team Rollag og Veggli.
Ragnar Tveiten - former Norwegian biathlete and world champion 
Kjell Hovda  - former Norwegian biathlete

References

Villages in Buskerud
Populated places on the Numedalslågen
Rollag